The Town of Blue River is a Statutory Town located in Summit County, Colorado, United States. The town population was 877 at the 2020 United States Census. The town is located in the Blue River Valley and is a part of Breckenridge, CO Micropolitan Statistical Area.

Geography

The town is located at  (39.432532, -106.037152).

At the 2020 United States Census, the town had a total area of  including  of water.

Demographics

As of the census of 2000, there were 685 people, 268 households, and 151 families residing in the town. The racial makeup of the town was 98.39% White, 0.15% Asian, 0.44% from other races, and 1.02% from two or more races. Hispanic or Latino of any race were 2.04% of the population.

There were 268 households, out of which 26.1% had children under the age of 18 living with them, 53.7% were married couples living together, 1.1% had a female householder with no husband present, and 43.3% were non-families. 16.8% of all households were made up of individuals, and 1.9% had someone living alone who was 65 years of age or older.  The average household size was 2.56 and the average family size was 2.82.

In the town, the population was spread out, with 17.4% under the age of 18, 11.4% from 18 to 24, 46.9% from 25 to 44, 21.8% from 45 to 64, and 2.6% who were 65 years of age or older.  The median age was 32 years. For every 100 females, there were 122.4 males.  For every 100 females age 18 and over, there were 126.4 males.

The median income for a household in the town was $61,964, and the median income for a family was $70,714. Males had a median income of $34,844 versus $32,083 for females. The per capita income for the town was $28,411.  About 2.8% of families and 7.0% of the population were below the poverty line, including 1.7% of those under age 18 and 21.4% of those age 65 or over.

See also

Colorado
Bibliography of Colorado
Index of Colorado-related articles
Outline of Colorado
List of counties in Colorado
List of municipalities in Colorado
List of places in Colorado
List of statistical areas in Colorado
Breckenridge, CO Micropolitan Statistical Area
 Blue River
 Front Range
 Tenmile Range
 White River National Forest

References

External links

Town of Blue River website
CDOT map of the Town of Blue River

Towns in Summit County, Colorado
Towns in Colorado